Mililani High School is the only public high school located in Mililani Town CDP, City and County of Honolulu, Hawaii, U.S. on the island of Oahu.

Serving an enrollment of over 2,600 students in grades 912, Mililani High School is one of the largest public schools in Hawaii. In 2005, the high school held the distinction of holding the largest graduating class in the state.

Mililani athletics
Mililani High School offers a wide range of sports and can be found in the Red Division of the Oahu Interscholastic Association or OIA conference.
Mililani High School's Boys Soccer team took first place in the Athletic Association Division 1 Soccer State Championship in 2012.
Mililani High School's Varsity and Junior Varsity Cheerleading teams took first place in the American National Cheerleading Competition in Las Vegas, Nevada.
In 2010, Mililani High School's Boys Basketball Division I defeated Moanalua High School at the Stan Sheriff Center in an overtime win for Consolation title with a score of 71-67.
In 2014, the Mililani Trojans claimed their first football state championship against defending state champions, Punahou, with a score of 53-45. The Trojans won their second state title in football defeating Iolani, 31-20 in 2016.

Notable alumni
Maggie Q (Class of 1997)  American actress, model and animal rights activist
Maa Tanuvasa (Class of 1988)  former NFL football player, Denver Broncos (1995–2000)
McKenzie Milton (Class of 2016)  college football quarterback, UCF (2016–2020), FSU (2021)
Dillon Gabriel (Class of 2019)  college football quarterback, UCF (2019–2021),  Oklahoma  (2021-present)
Angela Lee (Class of 2014)  mixed martial artist, ONE Championship Women's Atomweight Champion
Christian Lee (Class of 2016)  mixed martial artist, former ONE Championship Lightweight Champion
Darius Muasau (Class of 2019)  college football linebacker, Hawaii (2019-2021), UCLA (2021–present)

See also

 Mililani Middle School

References

External links
 
 Trojan Times (former student-run newspaper)
 Mililani Times (current student-run newspaper)

Public high schools in Honolulu County, Hawaii
Educational institutions established in 1973
1973 establishments in Hawaii